Fox is a Bulgarian television channel, owned by Fox International Channels, which was launched on 15 October 2012.

References

External links
 Official site

Television in Bulgaria
Television channels and stations established in 2012
Bulgaria